The Kele is a river in the Sakha Republic (Yakutia), Russia, a right tributary of the Aldan, part of the Lena basin. 

There are no settlements in the area of the river. The nearest village is Segyan-Kyuyol to the west, in the Tumara basin.

Course
The Kele originates in a small lake in the slopes of the southwestern Verkhoyansk Range. In the upper section of its course the river flows across mountainous terrain, heading roughly southwestwards in a narrow valley bound by the Munni Range on the western and the Sordogin Range on the eastern side.

After leaving the mountainous area the Kele flows roughly in the same direction in its middle and lower course. It meanders across a floodplain dotted with about 900 lakes where the riverbed divides into slowly-flowing arms. Finally the Kele meets the right bank of the Aldan River, a little upstream from the mouth of the Tumara and downstream of the Tukulan. The river freezes between mid October and mid May.

See also
List of rivers of Russia

References

Rivers of the Sakha Republic
Verkhoyansk Range
Central Yakutian Lowland